Prizzi's Glory is a satirical, semi-humorous crime novel by Richard Condon published in 1988.  It is the third of four novels featuring the Prizzis, a powerful family of Mafiosi in New York City. In all four novels the main protagonist is a top member of the family named Charlie Partanna. The book's events begin in 1986 and continue through the Presidential election of 1992.

Plot summary
Early in 1986 Charley Partanna, now in his 40s, is the Boss of the Prizzi family, secondary in authority only to Don Carraro himself, capo di tutti capi. As is his wont, he meets and falls instantly in love with an aspiring ballerina named Clair Coolidge. Clair runs one of the Prizzi's profitable new orgy rooms that are being franchised across the United States but sexually is extremely "straight" herself. Charley's dalliance with Clair, however, is sidetracked when Maerose Prizzi, the relentlessly ambitious granddaughter of the old Don finally coerces Charley into marrying her as the single most important step in her long-term plans to eventually succeed the Don and become the first female capo of a Mafia family. Charley and other members of the family carry out their usual murderous activities while Maerose puts into place the next step of her plans: the apparent death of Charley Partanna, vindicatore of the Prizza family, and his subsequence appearance on the world economic stage a year or so later as a supremely WASPish Charles Macy Barton. Barton takes over running the family's multi-tentacled financial affairs, generating new billions through Maerose's strategies that she wheedles the now-ancient Don into implementing. By the end of the book Charley, or Charles, has put key members of the family into positions of great political power and has himself become chief of staff to the reelected President of the United States.

Condon's style
Condon attacked his targets, usually gangsters, financiers, and politicians, wholeheartedly and with a uniquely original style and wit that make almost any paragraph from one of his books instantly recognizable. Reviewing one of his works in the International Herald Tribune, the well-known playwright George Axelrod (The Seven-Year Itch, Will Success Spoil Rock Hunter), who had collaborated with Condon on the screenplay for the film adaptation of The Manchurian Candidate, wrote:
"The arrival of a new novel by Richard Condon is like an invitation to a party.... the sheer gusto of the prose, the madness of his similes, the lunacy of his metaphors, his infectious, almost child-like joy in composing complex sentences that go bang at the end in the manner of exploding cigars is both exhilarating and as exhausting as any good party ought to be."

In Prizzi's Honor, Condon's normal exuberance was somewhat curbed by choosing to narrate the events through the viewpoints of its various semi-literate gangsters, which limited the scope of his imagery. In Glory, however, he returns to being his usual omniscient narrator, giving the reader:

[While making love] Charley felt a jolt of high voltage electricity run through his body, starting deep inside and spreading out simultaneously to the roof of his head as if a horned ibex had leaped from his stomach and crashed into his skull.

He showered, powdered, applied a deodorant so strong that it could also have been used as embalming fluid....

Eduardo had had several sets of various shaped denturess designed for wearing at the right place at the right time. To dominate board meetings he always wore either his Von Hindenburg dentures, which gave him heavy authority and served up the sounds from his larynx as if they had been placed on large Chincoteague oyster shells, or, if the assembly were a hostile one, his Sicilian dentures, which narrowed his face threateningly, having narrow high teeth and deadly incisors. For meetings with his father [Don Corrado], to indicate his total submission, he wore a copy of George [H.W.] Bush's teeth, made from photographs taken on the day the Iran-contra scandal had broken.

Real-life names in the book
All of Condon's books have, to an unknown degree, the names of real people in them as characters, generally very minor or peripheral. The most common, which appears in most of his books, is some variation of Franklin M. Heller. The real-life Heller was a television director in New York City in the 1950s, '60s, and 70s, who initially lived on Long Island and then moved to a house on Rockrimmon Road in Stamford, Connecticut. In this book he plays a minor role as president of the United States.

A.H. Weiler, a film critic for The New York Times, was another friend of Condon's who in this book is Dr. Abe Weiler, a face surgeon in Switzerland.

In a number of books a character named Keifetz appears, named apparently for Norman Keifetz, a New York City author who wrote a novel about a major league baseball player called The Sensation—that novel was dedicated to Condon. In this book he makes a brief appearance towards the end as a New York city homicide detective.

The Keener's Manual

Beginning with his first book, The Oldest Confession, Condon frequently prefaced his novels with excerpts of verse from a so-called Keener's Manual; these epigraphs foreshadowed the theme of the book or, in several instances, gave the book its title. The Keener's Manual, however, was a fictional invention by Condon and does not actually exist. A "keen" is a "lamentation for the dead uttered in a loud wailing voice or sometimes in a wordless cry"  and a "keener" is a professional mourner, usually a woman in Ireland, who "utters the keen... at a wake or funeral."

Five of Condon's first six books derived their titles from the fictional manual, the only exception being his most famous book, The Manchurian Candidate. The epigraph in The Manchurian Candidate, however, "I am you and you are me /and what have we done to each other?" is a recurring theme in earlier Condon's books: in various forms it also appears as dialog in both The Oldest Confession and Some Angry Angel. Among other epigraphs, the last line of "The riches I bring you /Crowding and shoving, /Are the envy of princes: /A talent for loving." is the title of Condon's fourth novel. His fifth and sixth novels, An Infinity of Mirrors and Any God Will Do, also derive their titles from excerpts of the manual.

Years later, Condon's 1988 novel Prizzi's Glory also had an epigraph from the manual, the first one in at least a dozen books.

Reception

Publishers Weekly loved it:
 The Prizzi family, the most lovable band of killers since Arsenic and Old Lace, returns in Condon's hilarious third and final entry in his thugs-to-riches saga of don Corrado Prizzi's billion-dollar Mafia clan. As the 1992 presidential elections approach, the Prizzis plot their most brazen foray yet into the American dream.... Prizzi's Glory is a classic black comedy, a send-up of national elections, nouvelle society, corporate management and celebrity worship. Condon's ear for dialogue has never been keener, and this razor-sharp satire on the American dream is the most cynical and entertaining view of U.S. politics and business since S. J. Perelman. Required reading for the November elections.

Kirkus Reviews had mixed feelings about it:
While the previous two Prizzi novels (Prizzi's Honor, Prizzi's Family) emphasized character-comedy and icy black humor, this conclusion to the trilogy is Condon at his political-cartooniest: the cheerfully ruthless Mafiosi now go all the way in their pursuit of high-placed power and utter respectability... until, by 1992, they manage to buy up everything, including the Presidency.... The whimsical plotting here is too far-fetched—and too illogical even on its own fanciful terms—for sustained involvement. Neither Charley nor Maerose exerts as much charm as before. But readers with a taste for rough-edged satire will find considerable pleasure along the way—in the vitriolic swipes at US politics (""dear old coot"" Reagan above all), in the cheerfully grim mayhem, and in Condon's inventive and literally tasty prose. (""Charley entered Eduardo's apartment as bland as a Reblochon cheese."")

The New York Times, definitely liked it:
The plot gives Mr. Condon ample elbow room for political and social satire that is always funny....Toward the end things take an unexpectedly serious turn and a touch of tragedy leavens the humor, a feature of the Prizzi novels that works perfectly here. We close the book with a sense of loss for Charley and for ourselves. We are going to miss those Prizzis.

References

External links

1988 novels
Novels by Richard Condon